Feltia is a genus of moths of the family Noctuidae.

Species
 Feltia austrina (Lafontaine, 1986) 
 Feltia beringiana (Lafontaine & Kononenko, 1986) 
 Feltia boreana (Lafontaine, 1986)  
 Feltia evanidalis (Grote, 1878) (syn: Feltia californiae McDunnough, 1939)
 Feltia floridensis Lafontaine, 2004 
 Feltia geniculata Grote & Robinson, 1868
 Feltia herilis (Grote, 1873)
 Feltia inyoca Lafontaine, 2004
 Feltia jaculifera (Guenée, 1852)
 Feltia manifesta (Morrison, 1875) 
 Feltia mollis (Walker, [1857]) 
 Feltia nigrita (Graeser, 1892) (formerly in Trichosilia)
 Feltia repleta (Walker, 1857)
 Feltia subgothica (Haworth, 1809)
 Feltia subterranea (Fabricius, 1794)
 Feltia tricosa (Lintner, 1874)
 Feltia troubridgei Lafontaine, 2004  
 Feltia woodiana (Lafontaine, 1986)

References
Natural History Museum Lepidoptera genus database
Feltia at funet

Noctuinae
Moth genera